Tertnes Idrettslag is a Norwegian multi-sports club from Bergen, founded on 25 January 1953.

Active in athletics, football, gymnastics, handball and mountaineering, it is best known for its women's handball team.

Handball 

The club has two sections for handball, the elite section named Tertnes Håndball Elite and a grassroots section.

The women's handball team quickly became the flagship of Tertnes, when they in 1992 managed to qualify for the Norwegian top division, Eliteserien. The team has played in the highest league since its promotion in 1992, and has won silver four times (1998/99, 2003/04, 2005/06 and 2008/09) and appeared in the cup final 3 times, placing second all times (2001/02, 2013 and 2016).

Former players include Cecilie Leganger, Kjersti Grini, Mette Davidsen, Mia Hundvin, Stine Skogrand, Terese Pedersen, Linn Gossé and Sakura Hauge.

Football 
The men's football team plays in the Fourth Division, the fourth tier of Norwegian football, having played in the Third Division from 2008 through 2016.

Norwegian handball clubs
Football clubs in Norway
Sport in Bergen
Defunct athletics clubs in Norway
Association football clubs established in 1953
1953 establishments in Norway
Multi-sport clubs in Norway